The Red Vineyards near Arles is an oil painting by the Dutch painter Vincent van Gogh, executed on a privately primed Toile de 30 piece of burlap in early November 1888.  It depicts workers in a vineyard, and it is the only painting known by name that Van Gogh sold in his lifetime.

History
The Red Vineyard was exhibited for the first time at the annual exhibition of Les XX, 1890, in Brussels, and sold for 400 francs (equal to about $2,000 today) to Belgian painter and collector Anna Boch, a member of Les XX. Anna was the sister of Eugène Boch, another impressionist painter and a friend of Van Gogh, too, who had painted Boch's portrait (Le Peintre aux Étoiles) in Arles, in autumn 1888. In a later letter to his brother Theo discussing the sale, Van Gogh admitted with some embarrassment that the Bochs paid the Les XX 1890 Exhibition sticker price, when in fact they probably should have gotten a "friend's price".

The painting was later purchased, in 1909, from a Paris art gallery by Ivan Morozov. After the Russian Revolution, the painting was subsequently nationalised by the Bolsheviks and was eventually passed to Moscow‘s Pushkin State Museum of Fine Arts, where it resides today.

See also
List of works by Vincent van Gogh

References

Sources
Hulsker, Jan. The Complete Van Gogh. Oxford: Phaidon, 1980. .
Pickvance, Ronald. Van Gogh in Arles (exh. cat. Metropolitan Museum of Art, New York), Abrams, New York 1984. .

External links 
 
  The Red Vineyard.com - history of the van Gogh Painting

Vincent van Gogh paintings of Arles
1888 paintings
Paintings in the collection of the Pushkin Museum
Farming in art
Horses in art
Water in art
Sun in art